Auto da Compadecida is a play written by Ariano Suassuna, published in 1955. Its first production was in 1956 in Recife, Pernambuco.

Auto da Compadecida is a comedy of northeast Brazil. It combines elements of the tradition of popular literature known as cordel, a striking feature of the Brazilian Catholic baroque, mixing popular culture and religious tradition. It is very important in Brazilian culture.

Film and television adaptations 
The play has been performed and adapted several times since its first production:
 A Compadecida (1969 film)
 Os Trapalhões no Auto da Compadecida (1987 film)
 Auto da Compadecida (1999 miniseries)
 O Auto da Compadecida (2000 film)

References 
1955 plays
Brazilian plays
Plays by Ariano Suassuna